Francesco Torti (30 November 1658 – 15 February 1741) was an Italian physician.

Biography
Torti was born in Modena and studied at the University of Bologna, graduating in 1678. In 1670 he and Bernardino Ramazzini headed the department of medicine in the newly created University of Modena. Under the patronage of the Duke of Modena, he instituted an amphitheater for anatomical observations.

He was the first to systematically study the effect of cinchona in the treatment of malaria. He prescribed a dosage that continued for a period of eight days beyond the febrile stage of malaria. As a physician, he was consulted by written correspondence by noblemen across Europe and a collection of 329 of his case studies were published into a two volume work in 2000. His major work was the Therapeutice Specialis ad Febres Quasdam Perniciosas (1712)online. Torti was the first to demonstrate the effectiveness of cinchona bark in the treatment of malaria. He was elected Fellow of the Royal Society in 1717. Although some sources consider him to have introduced the word "malaria", he never used the term in his writings. It was used mainly in folk medicine in Italy and appears even earlier in the writings of Florence Leonardo Bruni (1476).

Apart from medical writings, Torti also wrote poetry. Although married twice, he had no children. His manuscripts are archived in the Biblioteca Estense. He was buried in the church of Santa Maria della Pomposa, Modena and a square is named after him in Modena. A biography was written by his fellow Modenese, Muratori.

Published works

 
 (Modena, 1790, octavo)
 (Modena, 1715)
 (Modena, 1819)

See also 
History of malaria

References

External links 
 
 Complete digital facsimile of Therapeutice Specialis ad Febres Periodicas Perniciosas (1751) from the John Carter Brown Library

1658 births
1741 deaths
18th-century Italian physicians
People from Modena